Malaya Vereyka is a rural locality (a selo) in Zemlyanskoye Rural Settlement, Semiluksky District, Voronezh Oblast, Russia. The population was 543 as of 2010. There are 11 streets.

Geography 
Malaya Vereyka is located 49 km northwest of Semiluki (the district's administrative centre) by road. Dolgoye is the nearest rural locality.

References 

Rural localities in Semiluksky District